Tommy Clufetos (born December 30, 1979) is an American session drummer most noted for his work with Black Sabbath during their Black Sabbath Reunion Tour, which highlighted their new album 13. He also toured with them on their final tour. Clufetos is also the drummer for vocalist Ozzy Osbourne as well as the supergroup L.A. Rats.

Biography
Clufetos was born in Detroit, Michigan. He attended Rochester Adams High School in Rochester. He began playing drums around the age of six.

Career
Clufetos started playing drums at age seven and went on to join Mitch Ryder and the Detroit Wheels (1999) before joining forces with Ted Nugent (2001-2003). He played on Craveman and Love Grenade. After Ted Nugent, Tommy went on to join Alice Cooper's Band for his 2004 tour. He also performed on Alice Cooper's 2004 release Dirty Diamonds. He went on to join Rob Zombie from 2005 to 2010, and played on Zombie's 2006 album Educated Horses, on Zombie's first live release, 2007's Zombie Live, and on 2010s Hellbilly Deluxe 2.

In March 2010 Clufetos quit Rob Zombie to join Ozzy Osbourne. "I have no problem with [Ozzy], nor with Tommy joining his band," said Zombie. "My beef was the way Tommy did it. If he'd come to me and said he wanted to leave, I'd have said that was fine and wished him all the best. He didn't."

In May 2012, Clufetos played with Black Sabbath, filling in for original drummer Bill Ward. However, he did not perform on their album 13, as Brad Wilk ended up behind the kit during the sessions. Clufetos returned to Sabbath in April 2013 for their North American tour, starting in Houston on July 25, 2013. Clufetos continued with Sabbath in 2014 with the first show at the Barclays Center in Brooklyn, New York City, and the final show at Hyde Park, London. In 2015 Clufetos played with Ozzy Osbourne including Ozzfest Japan and others. In late 2015, Clufetos began rehearsals with Sabbath for their farewell tour simply titled "The End", starting on January 20, 2016, in Omaha, Nebraska through to a final show on February 4, 2017, at Birmingham England's Genting arena. He is thus featured on Sabbath's DVD The End.

In May 2021, it was announced that Clufetos joined with previous bandmates Rob Zombie and John 5 as well as Nikki Sixx to form a supergroup called L.A. Rats. Their debut track, "I've Been Everywhere", is from the soundtrack to the Liam Neeson film The Ice Road.

On June 16, 2022 Mötley Crüe began a summer tour at Truist Park in Atlanta, Georgia. After the band finished their fifth song, drummer Tommy Lee announced to the crowd that he was playing with broken ribs and was not able to finish the set. Lee announced Clufetos as his replacement for the remainder of the show.  Clufetos also relieved Lee on the tour's second stop at Hard Rock Stadium in Miami Gardens, Florida.

Equipment
Clufetos endorses Drum Workshop drums, Meinl Percussion cymbals, Vic Firth Drumsticks & Remo Drumheads .

Discography

Alice Cooper
2005: Dirty Diamonds

Ted Nugent
2002: Craveman
2007: Love Grenade

Lesley Roy
2008: Unbeautiful

Rob Zombie
2006: Educated Horses
2007: Zombie Live
2010: Hellbilly Deluxe 2

John 5
2007: The Devil Knows My Name
2008: Requiem
2009: Remixploitation
2010: The Art of Malice

Whitey Kirst
2012: All Rise!

Black Sabbath
 2013: Live... Gathered in Their Masses
 2016: The End
 2017: The End: Live in Birmingham

L.A. Rats
 2021: The Ice Road Soundtrack

Tommy Clufetos
 2021: Tommy's RockTrip: Beat Up By Rock 'N' Roll

DVDs
1999: Rock n' Roll Greats - In Concert - Mitch Ryder & the Detroit Wheels
2001: Full Bluntal Nugity - Ted Nugent
2006: "Ozzfest: 10th Anniversary" - Rob Zombie
2008: IMV Behind the Player (instructional DVD) - Tommy makes an appearance on John 5's guitar instructional DVD for IMV
2008: IMV Behind the Player (instructional DVD) with Tommy Clufetos.
2010: IMV Behind the Player (instructional DVD) Tommy makes an appearance on Ace Frehley's instructional DVD on the song "Shock Me"
2013: Live... Gathered in Their Masses - Black Sabbath

References

External links

Musicians from Detroit
Living people
1979 births
Musicians from Michigan
People from Rochester, Michigan
White Zombie (band) members
American heavy metal drummers
American rock drummers
American people of Greek descent
Black Sabbath members
Alice Cooper (band) members
The Ozzy Osbourne Band members
20th-century American drummers
American male drummers
21st-century American drummers